Gagarinskaya is a station on the Leninskaya Line of the Novosibirsk Metro. It opened on 2 April 1992.

Novosibirsk Metro stations
Railway stations in Russia opened in 1992
Zayeltsovsky City District, Novosibirsk
Railway stations located underground in Russia